Jobe Bells is a Christmas-themed hip hop album from independent rapper Afroman, released in 2004. It contains drug/sex themed parodies of various Christmas songs, such as the "12 Days of Christmas" and "Silent Night". The album received an unfavorable review from Rolling Stone.

Track listing
"Deck My Balls" (Intro) – 1:30
"Violent Night" – 5:51
"12 J's of Christmas" – 2:18
"Jobe Bells" – 2:09
"O Chronic Tree" – 1:25
"A Strainj Poem" – 2:54
"Death to the World" – 1:07
"Palmbells" – 1:04
"Nutscracker" – 1:38
"An Even Strainjer Poem" – 4:15
"12 J's of Christmas" (Instrumental) – 3:15
"I Wish You Would Roll a New Blunt" – 1:41

References

Afroman albums
2004 Christmas albums
Christmas albums by American artists